The Battle of Voronezh may refer to two battles of the Eastern Front of World War II around the city of Voronezh in Russia:
 Battle of Voronezh (1942), from June to July 1942, in which the German 4th Panzer Army captured the city
 Battle of Voronezh (1943), in January 1943, in which the Soviet Voronezh Front recaptured the city